Indhuja Ravichandran is an Indian actress who appears in Tamil films. She is known for her notable works in Meyaadha Maan (2017),  Mercury (2018)  & Bigil (2019).

Career
Indhuja Ravichandran, born and brought up in Vellore, Tamil Nadu, India pursued her schooling in Seventh-Day Adventist Mat. Hr. Sec. School Vellore. Degree in Software Engineering at Vellore Institute of Technology. While pursuing her degree, she did several modeling assignments, auditioned for different roles, did several short films both internally within the college, and outside the college for different college fests. She was spotted by Karthik Subburaj during her audition and eventually made her film debut with Meyaadha Maan, where she played Vaibhav's sister. M. Suganth, in a review of the film on the Times of India, stated that she made "a very impressive debut". In 2019, she starred in Bigil where she played a female soccer player.

Filmography

Films

Awards

Web series

References

External links
 

Living people
Actresses from Tamil Nadu
1994 births
People from Vellore district
Actresses in Tamil cinema
Indian film actresses
21st-century Indian actresses